Marginella helmatina is a species of sea snail, a marine gastropod mollusk in the family Marginellidae, the margin snails.

Subspecies
 Marginella helmatina cumingiana Petit de la Saussaye, 1841

Description
The length of the shell attains 20 mm.

Distribution
This marine species occurs off Gabon and São Tomé and Príncipe.

References

 Bernard P.A. (1984). Coquillages du Gabon [Shells of Gabon]. Pierre A. Bernard: Libreville, Gabon. 140 pp, 75 plates, illus
 Cossignani T. (2006). Marginellidae & Cystiscidae of the World. L'Informatore Piceno. 408pp

External links
 Rang, [S.. (1832). Marginelle. Marginella Lam. M. helmatine. M. helmatina Rang. Magasin de Zoologie,. 2: Classe V, Planche 5 (with unpaginated text).]

helmatina
Gastropods described in 1829